RFA Tidesurge may refer to the following ships of the British Royal Fleet Auxiliary:

 , Tide-class replenishment oiler of the Royal Fleet Auxiliary, in service 1955–1976 
 ,  of the Royal Fleet Auxiliary, currently fitting out

Royal Fleet Auxiliary ship names